Keynsham is the fourth album by the Bonzo Dog Band. It was released in 1969 on Liberty Records.

The album title is a reference to Horace Batchelor, a football pools predictor from Keynsham who regularly advertised his service on pop music radio broadcasts in the early 1960s. In advertisements Batchelor would spell out the town's name when reading his postal address. The album starts with a line taken from Batchelor's radio advertisement "I have personally won over..."

In 2007 the album was re-issued on CD by EMI with five bonus tracks. These bonus tracks were not performed by the Bonzo Dog Band. Instead they are actually taken from later solo single releases from the group members. The solo tracks are performed by Vivian Stanshall & Kilgaron, Neil Innes, Roger Ruskin Spear, and Topo D. Bil (a pseudonym of "Legs" Larry Smith.)

Reception
Reviewing the album for AllMusic, David Cleary said: "The delightfully clever humor of the Bonzo Dog Band's prior releases almost totally eludes the group on this record. Songs here still parody familiar styles, but generally do so in a leaden and unengaging manner. A number of the selections here burlesque the late Beatles, Buffalo Springfield, and similar bands... Lyrics and performances are bland and pedestrian by past group standards, and a noticeable lack of enthusiasm permeates this disc. This weak release is only recommended to completists." Trouser Press wrote that "Keynsham goes over familiar ground without laying much new sod (other than [Roger] Spear’s wiggly theremin solo on 'Noises for the Leg')."

Sleeve notes
"Mothers with children please note. This record is inedible!"

Track listing

Bonus tracks in 2007 CD re-issue

Personnel

Musicians
All music played by – Bonzo Dog Band
Cornet, Fish 'n' Chips – Gerry Salisbury ("Busted")
Functions Of The Body arranged by – R. Slater
Perfumed Parlour Snake – "Legs" Larry Smith
Theremin (Leg) – Roger Ruskin Spear
Narrator – Dennis Cowan, Vivian Stanshall

Other
Producer – Neil Innes, Vivian Stanshall
Engineer – Barry Sheffield
Cover design, liner notes – Vivian Stanshall

References

1969 albums
Bonzo Dog Doo-Dah Band albums
Liberty Records albums
EMI Records albums
Albums produced by Neil Innes
Albums produced by Vivian Stanshall
Sunset Records albums
Albums recorded at Trident Studios